John Taylor (22 August 1779, in Norwich – 5 April 1863, in London) was a British mining engineer.

Life
Taylor was the son of John and Susannah Taylor. He was the brother of Philip Taylor.

Business interests
Many of Taylor’s business interests were backed by the Martineau family. In 1796 he improvised a mechanised copper ore crusher at Wheal Friendship, a mine just outside Tavistock, Devon. This machine was improved over time and became widely adopted; it was known as the "Cornish rolls". Two years later, in 1798, when he was only 19 years old, he became the manager of this mine. Taylor’s sons and Peter Finch Martineau’s son and grandson were still active in its operations and oversight nearly a century later. 

From 1803 to 1817 Taylor oversaw the construction of the Tavistock Canal, which linked the town of Tavistock to Morwellham Quay on the River Tamar, where cargo was loaded into ships.

In 1812 Taylor set up as a chemical manufacturer at Stratford, Essex. This enterprise, also funded by the Martineaus, set out to produce vitriol, but as Taylor & Martineau became widely diversified. One of Taylor's interests was sugar refining, for which he took out a patent in 1815 for a pressure method for separation of sugar from molasses. The use of heated animal oils in sugar processes disclosed the production of naphtha. Taylor took out another patent in 1815, for decomposing animal oils into gas. This discovery led Taylor & Martineau into 1823 to what Philip Taylor's son later wrote of as "the battle of the gases": the commercial contest between gas lighting derived from coal and from oils. John Taylor's direction in the 1820s, however, was back into mining.

In 1819 Taylor raised the £65,000 needed to re-open the Consolidated Mines in Gwennap, Cornwall. This mine employed over 3,000 people and became the most productive in Cornwall, yielding almost 450,000 tons of copper ore. He was also mineral agent to the Duke of Devonshire and to the commissioners of Greenwich Hospital.

In 1824 he built the Redruth and Chasewater Railway to transport the ore from Consolidated Mines and others nearby to the port at Devoran.

In 1824 he also began a major expansion of the copper mines at Coniston in Cumbria, making them "the largest and most profitable copper mines in the north".

In 1836 he erected a new engine at Penrhyn Du and held a lease from 1838

Intellectual life
In 1807 Taylor was elected a Fellow of the Geological Society, and acted as treasurer from 1816 to 1844. In 1825 he was elected a Fellow of the Royal Society, and was one of the founders of the British Association on 26 June 1832, holding the office of treasurer till September 1861. He was one of the founders of University College, London, to which he acted as treasurer for many years.

Works
Taylor was the author of Statements concerning the Profits of Mining in England (London, 1825), edited Records of Mining in 1829, and contributed articles to scientific journals. A list of his publications may be found in the appendix of R. Burt, John Taylor, mining entrepreneur and engineer, 1779–1863, Moorland Publishing Company, 1977. He contributed articles on mining to Rees's Cyclopædia.

Family
Taylor in 1805 married Ann Pring, sister to Daniel Pring. They began a family at Holwell House, Whitchurch, Devon.

In 1829, Taylor and his family played host to composer Felix Mendelssohn at their country home in Wales.  While there, Mendelssohn composed several works, including his operetta Son and Stranger for his parents' silver wedding anniversary, an organ work for his sister's wedding, and three piano fantasias written as gifts for Taylor's daughters.

References

Attribution

External links

 

1779 births
1863 deaths
Engineers from Norwich
Mining in Cornwall
British civil engineers
Fellows of the Royal Society
Presidents of the Smeatonian Society of Civil Engineers
Fellows of the Geological Society of London
British mining engineers
Committee members of the Society for the Diffusion of Useful Knowledge